The 13th Critics' Choice Awards were presented on January 7, 2008 at the Santa Monica Civic Auditorium, honoring the finest achievements of 2007 filmmaking. The ceremony was broadcast on VH1 and hosted by D. L. Hughley. The nominees were announced on December 11, 2007.

Winners and nominees

Joel Siegel Award
Don Cheadle

Best Picture Made for Television
Bury My Heart at Wounded Knee
 The Company
 Tin Man
 The War

Statistics

Notes

References

Broadcast Film Critics Association Awards
2007 film awards